Khowban Razgah (also Romanized as Khowbān Razgāh) is a village in Goli Jan Rural District, in the Central District of Tonekabon County, Mazandaran Province, Iran. At the 2006 census, its population was 706, in 197 families.

References 

Populated places in Tonekabon County